Prospect Heights is a city in Cook County, Illinois, United States and is a suburb of Chicago. Per the 2020 census, the population was 16,058.

Geography

Demographics
As of the 2020 census there were 16,058 people, 6,144 households, and 4,205 families residing in the city. The racial makeup of the city was 61.41% White, 10.31% Asian, 1.51% African American, 1.33% Native American, 0.01% Pacific Islander, 14.14% from other races, and 11.30% from two or more races. Hispanic or Latino of any race were 28.99% of the population.

There were 6,144 households, out of which 51.95% had children under the age of 18 living with them, 52.70% were married couples living together, 10.34% had a female householder with no husband present, and 31.56% were non-families. 25.00% of all households were made up of individuals, and 11.74% had someone living alone who was 65 years of age or older. The average household size was 3.09 and the average family size was 2.59.

The city's age distribution consisted of 24.0% under the age of 18, 5.4% from 18 to 24, 29% from 25 to 44, 23.6% from 45 to 64, and 18.1% who were 65 years of age or older. The median age was 38.7 years. For every 100 females, there were 109.7 males. For every 100 females age 18 and over, there were 100.0 males.

The median income for a household in the city was $72,500, and the median income for a family was $84,803. Males had a median income of $48,699 versus $27,007 for females. The per capita income for the city was $39,534. About 6.5% of families and 10.0% of the population were below the poverty line, including 13.8% of those under age 18 and 7.0% of those age 65 or over.

Note: the US Census treats Hispanic/Latino as an ethnic category. This table excludes Latinos from the racial categories and assigns them to a separate category. Hispanics/Latinos can be of any race.

On April 5, 2011, Nicholas "Nick" Helmer was elected Mayor of Prospect Heights with 70% of the vote. Less than thirty days after being sworn in, Mayor Helmer rehired police officers that were laid off by the prior administration.

Education
Most of Prospect Heights is served by the Prospect Heights School District 23, which contains four schools:

Dwight D. Eisenhower Elementary (K-1)
Betsy Ross Elementary (2-3)
Anne Sullivan Elementary (4-5)
MacArthur Middle School (6-8)

Other districts that serve portions of Prospect Heights include:
 Wheeling Community Consolidated School District 21
 Whitman Elementary School (K-5) (In Wheeling)
 Twain Elementary School (K-5) (In Wheeling)
 Frost Elementary School (K-5) (In Mount Prospect)
 Holmes Middle School (6-8) (In Wheeling)
 River Trails School District 26
 Euclid Elementary School (K-5) (In Mount Prospect)
 River Trails Middle School (6-8) (In Mount Prospect)

Township High School District 214 serves Prospect Heights. Students attend either Wheeling High School or John Hersey High School. Those in District 23's area will attend either. Those in District 21's area will attend Wheeling and those in District 26's area will attend Hersey.

Private education in Prospect Heights is St. Alphonsus Liguori Catholic Parish and St. Viator High School in Arlington Heights.

Transportation
In addition to PACE buses, Prospect Heights is serviced by two Metra lines, with service to Union Station from a station on the North Central Service, while the Union Pacific / Northwest Line has two stations nearby.

Notable people
 Steve Chen, co-founder of YouTube
 Charlie Kirk, founder of Turning Point USA
 Anson Mount, actor
 Marty Robinson, radio/TV performer
 Ben Weasel, singer of punk rock band Screeching Weasel

References

links history of SSA6/Lake Claire Water: http://prev.dailyherald.com/story/?id=321146
http://articles.chicagotribune.com/2006-11-30/news/0611300086_1_lake-michigan-lake-water-city-water

External links
City of Prospect Heights

Cities in Illinois
Chicago metropolitan area
Cities in Cook County, Illinois